Senator Arriola may refer to:

Elizabeth P. Arriola (1928–2002), Senate of Guam
Joaquin C. Arriola (1925–2022), Senate of Guam